Arsikere Junction railway station, also known as Arasikere Junction railway station (station code: ASK). It is railway junction in Hassan district, Karnataka. It serves Arsikere city. The station consists of three platforms. The platforms are well sheltered. It is facilitated with water and sanitation. The station is a major railway junction between Bangalore, Hubli, Shimoga, Mysore, Hassan, Chikmagalur and Mangalore.

References

Railway junction stations in Karnataka
Railway stations in Hassan district
Mysore railway division